The Messenger is a 2015 documentary film written and directed by Su Rynard, focusing on the protection of multiple types of songbirds throughout the world. The film's world premiere took place at the Hot Docs Canadian International Documentary Festival on April 28, 2015.

Cast

The film features German composer and DJ Dominik Eulberg, expert Dr. Bridget Stutchbury, Michael Mesure, Dr. Christy Morrissey, Turkish ecologist Çağan Şekercioğlu, and ornithologist Alejandra Martinez-Salinas.

Accolades
At the Hot Docs festival, The Messenger finished third in the audience balloting.

Daniel Grant and Amar Arhab received a Canadian Screen Award nomination for Best Cinematography in a Documentary at the 4th Canadian Screen Awards.

Release
US Rights for the film were acquired by Kino Lorber, which started a limited theatrical run beginning in December 2015.

References

External links
 Indiegogo (crowdfunding page)
 Official Facebook page
 
 The Hollywood Reporter (review)

Bird conservation
Canadian documentary films
2015 in the environment
2015 films
Documentary films about environmental issues
Films about birds
2015 documentary films
Songbirds
Crowdfunded films
2010s English-language films
2010s Canadian films